"Hype" is a song by English rapper Dizzee Rascal and Scottish DJ Calvin Harris. The song was released as a single on 24 June 2016. Rascal and Harris had previously collaborated on the 2008 single "Dance wiv Me", the 2009 single "Holiday" and on "Here 2 China", a song from Harris's third studio album, 18 Months (2012).

Although Harris and Rascal had previously worked together on several singles they did so remotely, emailing the track components back and forth, "Hype" marks the first song they worked on together in the same studio at the same time. Dizzee claims the words were written in the studio in an hour, and the vocals recorded and finished in a further half hour.

Track listing

Charts

References

External links
 

2016 singles
2016 songs
Calvin Harris songs
Dizzee Rascal songs
Island Records singles
Songs written by Calvin Harris
Songs written by Dizzee Rascal